The FundéuRAE (Fundéu being an acronym for ) is a non-profit organization founded in February 2005 in Madrid, Spain. The foundation was created in collaboration with the Royal Spanish Academy (a government institution that standardizes Spanish) and under the Department of Urgent Spanish of Agencia EFE. It took a new name, Fundéu BBVA, in 2008, and, after a short while with  the original name, adopted in 2020 FundéuRAE.

Word of the year
The Word of the Year has been named since 2013 by the Fundéu in collaboration with the Royal Spanish Academy. Fundéu started to name a word of the year in 2013. Javier Lascurain, Fundéu's subdirector and periodist explained "we are looking for a term that is representative of 2013 from the current point of view, of what has been talked about in the media, and that at the same time has a certain linguistic interest due to its formation, its origin, and its use" and announced a shortlist of twelve words.

References

Bibliography
 Morales, Humberto Lopez. Globalizacion del léxico hispánico. Madrid: Espasa Calpe Mexicana, S.A., 2007.
 Senz Bueno, Silvia. "Fundéu-BBVA: el largo brazo de la RAE en los medios", Addenda et Corrigenda; from Senz, S., and Alberte, M. (eds): El dardo en la Academia. Esencia y vigencia de las academias de la lengua española, Barcelona: Melusina, 2011, p. 239-257.

External links 

 Homepage
 Wikilengua
 Departamento de Español Urgente
 Word of the Year

Spanish language
Foundations based in Spain